Patrick Charles Schiller (born November 12, 1988) is an American football  linebacker who is currently a free agent. Schiller was signed as an undrafted free agent following the 2012 NFL Draft by the Atlanta Falcons. He played college football for Northern Illinois University (NIU), where he helped lead the Huskies to MAC Championship. Schiller was signed by the St. Louis Rams of National Football League (NFL) on July 22, 2014, where he was later placed on season-ending Injured/Reserve status.

Early life
A native of Geneva, Illinois, Schiller attended Geneva High School and lettered in football as a linebacker and running back. Schiller earned all-conference as a junior and as a senior earned all-conference all-area and all-state honors.

College career
Schiller recorded 239 tackles in his four-year career with the Huskies. He also tallied 19 tackles for loss, three sacks, eight pass breakups, three forced fumbles, and an interception. He played in 48 games with 27 starts. He tied for seventh in NIU history with 148 assisted tackles in his career despite missing the majority of his junior year due to a knee injury. He was a Mid-American Conference selection in 2011 by Phil Steele Schiller was Named NIU Linebacker of the Year by the coaching staff.

Professional career

2012 NFL Draft
Pre-draft measurables

Atlanta Falcons
Schiller was signed by the Falcons on April 29, 2012. Schiller had a career-high eleven tackles versus the Jacksonville Jaguars on August 30, in their last preseason game of the Falcons. Schiller was signed to the team's practice squad on September 2, 2012. The Falcons went on to have a 13-3 record. The Falcons released Schiller on August 30, 2013.

On November 21, 2012, while on the Falcon's practice squad, Schiller was featured on the cover story of The New York Times Magazine of November 21, 2012, as a "long-shot" for signing a longer-term NFL contract.

After being cut by the Falcons, Schiller helped mentor the linebackers of the Geneva High School Vikings team, in the fall of 2013, both at practices and during games

St Louis Rams
The St. Louis Rams signed Schiller on July 22, 2014. He was placed on Reserve/Injured status after clearing waivers on August 26, 2014. His playing career ended with an injury settlement after doctors found three herniated discs in his neck.

Post-NFL career 
After his NFL career ended, Schiller returned to Geneva, Illinois, working at S&K Landscape Co., a property management and maintenance company that he co-owned. In 2015 he became the varsity linebackers coach at St. Charles East High School in St. Charles, Illinois.

References

External links
Patrick Schiller - official page at Northern Illinois University

1988 births
Living people
Players of American football from Chicago
American football linebackers
Northern Illinois Huskies football players
People from Geneva, Illinois